The Swift DB2 is a purpose-built 2-liter prototype, designed, developed and built by American company Swift Engineering, for Sports 2000 racing, in 1985. As per the rules and regulations, it is powered by a naturally aspirated  EAO four-cylinder engine, derived from the Ford Pinto, producing a respectable . This drives the rear wheels through a Hewland Mk.8 four-speed manual transmission. It is also very light, weighing only .

References

Swift Engineering vehicles
Sports prototypes